Hot Creations is a British record label co-founded by Jamie Jones and Lee Foss.

The company was founded in 2010, and has produced a number of new acts, sub-labels and brands. HOTTRAX and Emerald City were founded as sister labels. The musical group, Hot Natured, which consists of Jones, Foss, Ali Love and Luca Cazal, was founded within the label. The group's release, "Benediction" from the 2013 album Different Sides of the Sun, charted in the UK Top 40. To date, Hot Creations has released nearly 100 EPs from artists such as Benoit & Sergio, Patrick Topping, Andrea Oliva, Alan Fitzpatrick, Rebuke, Route 94, MK.

References 

British record labels
British companies established in 2010